Turn the Beat Around is a 2010 MTV original film produced by MTV and Paramount Pictures.

Plot
Turn the Beat Around focuses around a 21-year-old woman named Zoe (played by Romina D'Ugo) who dreams of becoming a famous dancer similar to her idol Malika (played by Brooklyn Sudano) and she persuades a local dance club owner Michael Krasny (played by David Giuntoli) to open a disco-themed danceclub. Zoe's rather unsupportive boyfriend Chris (played by Adam T. Brooks) doesn't approve of their partnership. The film features original music performed by Just Kait and Jason Derülo.

Cast
 Romina D'Ugo as Zoe
 David Giuntoli as Michael Krasny
 Adam T. Brooks as Chris
 Brooklyn Sudano as Malika 
 Shauna MacDonald as Cynthia
 David Keeley as Roy
 Jacqueline MacInnes Wood as Irena
 Dewshane Williams as Ramon
 Simin Aamin as Selma
 Kevin McGarry as Jonah
 Shawn Byfield as Asa
 Miles Faber as D-Day
 Jason Derulo as himself

References

External links
 
 
 

2010 television films
2010 films
2010 romantic drama films
American dance films
American romantic drama films
American romantic musical films
Paramount Pictures films
American television films
2010s English-language films
2010s American films